"Someday" is a song by Danish soft rock band Michael Learns to Rock and was the first single from their third album Played on Pepper, released in 1995.

Background
Released in August 1995, "Someday" is one of the band's most beloved songs, and a classic of their repertoire. Though it only charted in Denmark, peaking at number three, it was a moderate hit in Italy and South East Asia and a big hit in Argentina, and has since been performed on a regular basis during their Asian tours.

Music video
The video was shot in Bali, Indonesia, which features the band singing on the Padang-Padang beach.

Track listings
Played on Pepper - Album CD-Maxi

Chart performance

Media usage
The song is briefly featured in the 2010 South Indian parody film Thamizh Padam, as the protagonist's "family song".

See also
 Danish pop

References

External links
 

1995 songs
1995 singles
Michael Learns to Rock songs
EMI Records singles
Songs written by Jascha Richter